Australian Dream is a 1986 Australian comedy film directed by Jackie McKimmie and starring Noni Hazlehurst, Graeme Blundell, John Jarratt. Funding was provided in part from the Queensland Film Corporation and Australian Film Commission. It was shot over four weeks and finished on 20 September 1985.

Cast

 Noni Hazelhurst as Dorothy Stubbs
 Graeme Blundell  as Geoffrey Stubbs
 John Jarratt as Todd

References

External links
 

1986 films
Australian comedy films
1986 comedy films
Films set in Queensland
1980s English-language films
1980s Australian films